Bahi is town and an administrative ward in the Dodoma Region of Tanzania. It is the district capital of Bahi District.

Transport
The paved trunk road T3 from Morogoro to the Rwandan border passes through the town.

The central railway of Tanzania passes through the town as well and there is a train station in Bahi.

References

Wards of Dodoma Region